Muriel Annie Lowe (17 June 1906 – 25 June 1966) was an English cricketer who played as a right-handed batter and right-arm medium bowler. She appeared in three Test matches for England in 1937, all against Australia. She played domestic cricket for various composite XIs, including South of England.

She later founded a travel agency in Winchester, where she died in 1966.

References

External links
 
 

1906 births
1966 deaths
People from Long Eaton
Cricketers from Derbyshire
England women Test cricketers